Darutta is a village of Bhawana City located near Ramzan Sugar Mills on Jhang Chiniot road.

Main tribes  
 Kharal 
 Mumbarr(Rind)

Main personalities

 Noor Ahamd Khan Mumbarr (Late.dep.sectry finance Pakistan)
 Rai Fazal Abbas Kharal
 Khan Yousaf Khan Mumbarr
 Rai Iqbal Khan Kharal
 Rai Shahid Kharal (ex.gen. counciler)
 Khan Yaqoob Khan Mumbarr
 Manak Khan Mumbarr (ex. counciler)  

Chiniot District
Villages in Chiniot District